Shane Lee (born 8 August 1973) is a former Australian first-class cricketer. He was an all-rounder known for his hard batting and medium-pace bowling and is the elder brother of Australian pace bowler Brett Lee. He played for Australia and also captained the NSW team.

Career
Lee was a promising junior, representing the Australia under-19 team. He was an AIS Australian Cricket Academy scholarship holder in 1990 and 1994 and was a contemporary of future international teammate Adam Gilchrist. He first played for New South Wales in 1993 and was called up for the Australian one day team in 1995.

Despite being included in the 1996 and 1999 World Cup squads, he only really established himself in the team in the 1999–2000 Carlton and United Series along with the emergence of his younger brother, fast bowler Brett Lee. His best bowling performance in ODI was 8.1–0–33–5 against Sri Lanka at MCG in 1999 during the Carlton & United Series.

He also had a successful season with Somerset, scoring over 1,000 runs in 1996, and Worcestershire in the English County Championship.

In 2002 aged just 29, Lee retired from cricket due to knee injuries. Between 1995 and 2001 he played 45 One Day Internationals scoring 477 runs and taking 48 wickets.

Personal life
Lee is the oldest of three boys and they grew up in the Shellharbour suburb of Oak Flats. He regularly played cricket with younger brothers Brett and Grant outside their house and they followed his footsteps into the New South Wales under-17 team, although Grant later gave up the game at age 18.

Nine Network's Changing Rooms, hosted by Suzie Wilks, featured Shane and brother Brett renovating each other's rooms with help from a professional designer.

He is also a member of rock group Six & Out, along with his brother Brett and four former New South Wales teammates. Shane plays lead and rhythm guitars, and supplies backing vocals.

References

External links
 

1973 births
Living people
Australia One Day International cricketers
New South Wales cricketers
Somerset cricketers
Worcestershire cricketers
Sportspeople from Wollongong
Australian cricketers
Australian Institute of Sport cricketers
Cricketers from New South Wales
Cricketers at the 1996 Cricket World Cup
Cricketers at the 1999 Cricket World Cup